Francesca Calò (born 25 May 1995) is a Swiss footballer who plays as a defender for Frauen-Bundesliga club 1. FC Köln and the Switzerland national team.

References

1995 births
Living people
Swiss women's footballers
Women's association football defenders
SV Werder Bremen (women) players
1. FC Köln (women) players
Frauen-Bundesliga players
2. Frauen-Bundesliga players
Switzerland women's international footballers
Swiss expatriate women's footballers
Swiss expatriate sportspeople in Germany
Expatriate women's footballers in Germany